The Texas House of Representatives 52nd district represents eastern and central Williamson County. The current Representative is James Talarico, who due to 2021 redistricting, will instead seek election in the 50th district in 2022.

Major cities in this district include parts of Round Rock, Georgetown, Taylor, Hutto, and Leander.

References 

52